Cranston was an unincorporated community in Muscatine County, Iowa, United States.

History
Cranston was a stop on the Milwaukee Road, which was removed in 1982, although little remains of the community today. Cranston's population was 42 in 1925.

There are thirteen houses remaining in Cranston. The Cranston graveyard, containing predominantly Protestant graves, is a half mile east of the town.

Education
Cranston residents are zoned to schools of the Louisa–Muscatine Community School District.

References

Unincorporated communities in Muscatine County, Iowa
Unincorporated communities in Iowa